Tidfrith or Tidferth may refer to:

Tidfrith (Dunwich) (fl. 798–c. 820), bishop of Dunwich
Tidfrith (Hexham) (fl. 810s), bishop of Hexham